Output is the debut album by Dutch DJ and producer Fedde le Grand. Fedde produced all songs on the album with co-production by Robin M, Funkerman, Raf Jansen, Christian von Staffeldt and Patric La Funk.

The album was released internationally on 14 September 2009 containing 12 tracks and the bonus track "New Life". The album was first released in the Netherlands, Scandinavia, Hungary, Russia, Japan and Australia. It was also released in countries such as South Africa, Venezuela, United States, Italy and Germany later that year. The Japanese, Australian and German editions of the album contain bonus tracks such as the previous released singles including "Let Me Think About It" (remix of an Ida Corr song) and "The Creeps" (Camille Jones song remix).

Singles

"3 Minutes to Explain" was already released in summer 2008, but due to plans to release the album Output simultaneously around the world, further single were released many months later.
"Scared of Me", the official first single off the album, came out in May 2009
"Output", the title track, was released as a digital single in July 2009
"Let Me Be Real", the second major single was released in August 2009
"Back & Forth" followed in February 2010.
"New Life", another collaboration with Funkerman was released in May 2010.

Track listings

Standard edition

German limited edition

Music videos

Charts

Release history

References

External links
 Output at Fedde Le Grand's official site

2009 debut albums
Fedde le Grand albums